Ketty La Torre (born 25 December 1972) is an Italian short track speed skater. She competed in the women's 3000 metre relay event at the 1992 Winter Olympics.

References

1972 births
Living people
Italian female short track speed skaters
Olympic short track speed skaters of Italy
Short track speed skaters at the 1992 Winter Olympics
Sportspeople from Monza